This is a list of the squads for the 2018 CONCACAF Women's U-20 Championship, which was held in Trinidad and Tobago between 18–28 January 2018. The 8 national teams involved in the tournament were required to register a squad of 20 players; only players in these squads were eligible to take part in the tournament.

Players marked (c) were named as captain for their national squad.

Group A

Trinidad and Tobago
Coach:  Jamaal Shabazz

Haiti
Coach:  Marc Collat

Costa Rica
Coach:  Amelia Valverde

Canada
Coach:  Bev Priestman

Group B

United States
Coach:  Jitka Klimková

Nicaragua
Coach: Elna Dixon

Mexico
Coach:  Christopher Cuéllar

Jamaica
Coach:  Lorne Donaldson

References

squads